José Juvenal Velandia, a.k.a. Iván Ríos, a.k.a. Manuel Jesús Muñoz Ortiz, (19 December 1961 – 3 March 2008), born in San Francisco, Putumayo, Colombia, was the Head of the Central Bloc of the Revolutionary Armed Forces of Colombia (FARC-EP) and the youngest member of this guerrilla's Central High Command.

Death
Ríos was killed by his security chief, Pablo Montoya, on 3 March 2008 in a mountainous area of the western department of Caldas. Colombian military forces were involved in an operation to capture Ríos, when a FARC member named as "Rojas", on 6 March 2008, delivered a severed right hand, a laptop computer and an ID to the troops. "Rojas" claimed that they belonged to Ríos, whom he described as his boss. Pablo Montoya claimed to have killed Ríos three days earlier. Fingerprint results proved that the hand did belong to Ríos, resulting in Colombian authorities going to recover the body.

See also
 2008 Andean diplomatic crisis
 Raúl Reyes

References

External links

Video
 , filmed in Villa Nueva Colombia, en español

Members of FARC
2008 deaths
Colombian guerrillas killed in action
Colombian communists
Anti-revisionists
1961 births
People from Putumayo Department